The Alamosa Formation is a geologic formation in Colorado. It preserves fossils. The formation was deposited by Lake Alamosa, a paleolake that existed from the Pliocene to the middle Pleistocene.

See also

 List of fossiliferous stratigraphic units in Colorado
 Paleontology in Colorado

References

Geologic formations of Colorado